The Towamba River is an open mature wave dominated barrier estuary or perennial river, located in the South Coast region of New South Wales, Australia.

Course and features
The river flows generally southeast and then northeast, joined by twelve tributaries including the Mataganah Creek and Wog Wog River, before reaching its mouth, emptying into Nullica Bay, within Twofold Bay, and spilling into the Tasman Sea of the South Pacific Ocean, east of Boydtown. The river descends  over its  course.

At the locality of Kiah, the Princes Highway crosses the Towamba River.

The river flows through extensive parts of the South East Forest National Park in its upper reaches. In its lower reaches, the river forms the northern boundary of Mount Imlay National Park.

See also

 Towamba River bridge, New Buildings
 List of rivers of Australia
 List of rivers in New South Wales (L-Z)
 Rivers of New South Wales

References

External links
 

Rivers of New South Wales
South Coast (New South Wales)